Liga ASOBAL 2001–02 season was the 12th since its establishment. A total of 16 teams competed this season for the championship.

Competition format
This season, the competition was played in a round-robin format, through 30 rounds. The team with most points earned wins the championship. The last two teams were relegated.

Overall standing

Top goal scorers

2000
Liga Ascobal
Spain